Literary Theory: An Introduction is a 1983 book by Terry Eagleton that overviews and responds to modern literary theory.

References

Bibliography

External links 
 Full text via the Internet Archive

Non-fiction books
English-language books